Kim Jae-duck (born August 7, 1979) is a South Korean singer, rapper, and choreographer. He is known as a member of Sechs Kies, which was a rival band to the top boy group in the 90's, H.O.T. and reunited in 2016. When Sechs Kies disbanded in 2000, he started a new band, J-Walk with Jang Suwon, also from Sechs Kies. Kim is known for his Busan accent and his nickname is "Ducky" as a reference to his name.

Career

Early years and formation of SechsKies 
Kim and fellow Busan native Lee Jai-jin  formed a dance crew called Quicksilver, and was selected as a trainee in Lee Juno's company. Lee Juno was famous as Seo Taiji and Boys' member. At that time Lee Ho yeon, Daesung Entertainment's CEO, asked him to recommend an idol group member.  That is how he became a Sechs Kies's member. 
In 2016, Kang Sung-hoon said that he had watched the audition tape and chosen Kim as a member for his superior dancing skill. The duo moved to Seoul to finish high school while training at Daesung Entertainment.

1997–2000: SechsKies 
SechsKies made their debut in April 1997 and quickly came to be seen as a rival of H.O.T, who had debuted a year earlier and were considered the first K-pop idol group to achieve mainstream recognition and success. Kim and Lee, who were the main dancers and choreographers, were largely responsible for some of the group's most memorable dances. Kim was not given many singing parts and was instead known for rapping in the Busan dialect. SechsKies went on to establish themselves as one of the most popular boy bands of the late 1990s, scoring a string of #1 hits on music programs. However they suddenly disbanded in 2000 and performed for the final time at the Dream Concert that May at the Seoul Olympic Stadium.

2000–2015: J-Walk and other solo activities 
After SechsKies disbanded 2000 when the members announced they wanted to split ways, Kim was set to become a dance instructor for Sechs Kies label Daesung Entertainment but he ended up joining with his former Sechs Kies member Jang Su-won to form a new duo J-Walk in 2002 under a new label, Kiss Entertainment.

They released their first album, entitled Suddenly in March 2002, and the title track, Suddenly, became a huge hit. They released second album Someday at the same year. Both two albums were well received and acclaimed and they took SBS Gayo Daejeon Popularity Award with former Sechs Kies member Kang Sung-hun in 2002.

Their first EP Sun Shower(여우비) was delayed until 2007 when they signed with Vitamin Entertainment. J-Walk released their third album My Love in 2008 and Eun Ji-won helped them by participating in the music video and featuring in the title song. Since Kim Jae-duck entered the military shortly after, Su-won had to promote the album by himself.

After Su-won was discharged from army, J-Walk has signed under A&G Modes and released some digital songs. They returned with mini album "Love...Painfully" with main track "Strive" in December 2013.

2016–present: SechsKies reunion 
In 2016, Kim reunited with his former bandmates through the variety show Infinite Challenge. There had already been prior speculation about a reunion as Kim himself, leader Eun Ji-won and vocalist Jang Su-won had cautiously hinted that all members were in discussions except vocalist Ko Ji-yong, who had completely left the entertainment industry to start his own business and was already married. During the "Totoga" segment of Infinite Challenge, the five members organized a guerrilla concert, the first time they had stood together on stage as SechsKies in over fifteen years. Ko made a surprise appearance backstage to reunite with the five members and during the concert for an emotional rendition of their award-winning hit "Couple". SechsKies (except Ko Ji-yong) signed with YG Entertainment for all group activities while Kim and other members remained with their individual management agencies. It was decided that they would promote as a group and temporarily postponed solo activities.

Outside of SechKies, Kim has appeared on several variety shows, usually with his friend Tony An. He co-hosted the restaurant touring show Delicious Man''' with An. He also appeared on My Little Old Boy, a reality show that An was participating in.

 Personal life 
Kim is currently housemates with former H.O.T. member Tony An. The arrangement had caused a stir amongst their contemporaries as both groups were regarded as one another's fiercest industry rivals during the late 1990s and largely avoided any contact with one another despite crossing paths many times. They had met and befriended one another during their mandatory military service. In 2014 Kim became a director of the entertainment agency which Tony An founded, TN Nation Entertainment.

 Discography 

 In J-Walk Suddenly (2002)Someday (2002)여우비/Sunshower (EP) (2007)My Love (2008)Frappuccino (EP) (2013)Love...Painfully (EP)'' (2013)

Music credits

Filmography

Film

Variety Shows

See also 
 Sechs Kies
 K-pop
 Korean music
 Daesung Entertainment

References 

1979 births
K-pop singers
Living people
DSP Media artists
Sechs Kies members
South Korean male singers
South Korean male idols
South Korean pop singers
South Korean male rappers
South Korean hip hop dancers